Islam in Cyprus is the island's second largest religion and the predominant faith of Northern Cyprus. Islam was introduced to Cyprus when the island finally fell to Umayyad conquerors during the Arab-Byzantine wars.  Prior to this, the Muslim presence on the island was itinerant. Conversion to Islam was not compulsory but the majority of the Catholic Latin population of the island, along with a smaller subsection of the Greek Orthodox population, converted to Islam.

Before the Turkish invasion of Cyprus in 1974, the Turkish Cypriots (the Muslim community of Cyprus) made up 18% of the island's population and lived throughout the island. Today, most of the estimated 264,172 Muslims are based in the north of the island. Turkish Cypriot society is markedly secular though, at least formally; adherents to the faith subscribe mostly to the Sunni branch, with an influential stream of Sufism underlying their spiritual heritage and development. Nazim al-Qubrusi, the leader of the Naqshbandi-Haqqani order, hailed from Larnaca and lived in Lefka. Another branch among the Turkish Cypriot Muslims is Alevism. There are also a few Turkish Cypriots who are Ahmadi Muslims.

History 

Islam came to Cyprus early on in the Arab conquests  though a permanent presence only followed the Ottoman conquest in 1571.

It is rumored that an aunt of Muhammad, Umm Haram, had accompanied one of the early Arab expeditions to the island. She died during the expedition and was buried at the present Hala Sultan Tekke monument.

Since the Turkish invasion of Cyprus in 1974, the Muslim population in the north of the island has been bolstered by settlers from Turkey who are almost exclusively Sunni Muslims. The status of these settlers is disputed under international law and specifically the prohibition, under the Geneva Convention, on the cross-border transfer of populations by states aiming to engineer changes in the demographic make-up of other states.

The segregation of Cypriot Turks and Greeks has effected that most of the Muslims in the territory controlled by the Republic of Cyprus are Arab immigrants and refugees, unrelated to the Turks historically living in the area.

Important landmarks 

Several important Islamic shrines and landmarks exist on the island including:
the Arabahmet Mosque in Nicosia (built in the 16th century)
the Hala Sultan Tekke/Umm Haram Mosque in Larnaca (built in the 18th century)
the Lala Mustafa Pasha Mosque, Selimiye Mosque and the Haydarpasha Mosque; former Catholic cathedrals left from the Crusader era, which were meant to cater exclusively to the Catholic minority which ruled the island and were converted to mosques after the Muslim conquest in the Middle Ages.

Gallery

See also  

 List of mosques in Cyprus
 Religion in Cyprus

References 

 
Religion in Cyprus